
Sahul, also called Sahul-land, Meganesia, Papualand and Greater Australia, was a paleocontinent that encompassed the modern-day landmasses of mainland Australia, Tasmania, New Guinea, and the Aru Islands.

Sahul was in the south-western Pacific Ocean, located appropriately north to south between the Equator and the 44th parallel south and west to east between the 112th and the 152nd meridians east. Sahul was separated from Sunda to its west by the Wallacean Archipelago.

After the last Ice Age global temperatures increased and sea levels gradually rose, flooding the land bridge and separating mainland Australia from New Guinea and Tasmania. New Guinea was separated from the Australian mainland approximately 8,000 years ago, and Tasmania approximately 6,000 years ago.

Sahul hosted a large variety of unique fauna that evolved independently from the rest of the world. Most notably nearly all mammals on Sahul were marsupials including a range of browsers, burrowers, scavengers and predators; bats and rodents represented the only placental mammals. 

It is estimated humans first colonised Sahul between 45,000 and 60,000 years ago, making the ocean crossing from Sunda through Wallacea. From Sahul humans spread throughout Oceania.

The name Sahul is used by archeologists, while the name Meganesia tends to be used by zoogeographers. The name Greater Australia has been used, but it has been criticised as "cartographic imperialism" because it places greater emphasis upon what is now Australia at the expense of New Guinea.

See also

 
 List of paleocontinents

Notes

References

Citations

Bibliography 

 

 

 

 

 

 

 

 

Australia (continent)
Continents
Historical continents
Oceania
Asia-Pacific
Pacific Ocean
Southern Ocean
Indian Ocean